Antissinae is a subfamily of soldier flies in the family Stratiomyidae.

Genera
Anacanthella Macquart, 1855
Antissa Walker, 1854
Antissella White, 1914
Cyanauges Rondani, 1863
Discopteromyia Meijere, 1913
Exodontha Rondani, 1856
Lecomyia White, 1916
Opaluma Lessard & Woodley, 2020

References

Stratiomyidae
Taxa named by Kálmán Kertész
Brachycera subfamilies